Judith Ann Bentinck, Countess of Portland, Countess Bentinck und Waldeck Limpurg (née Emerson; born 10 October 1952 in Newcastle-Under-Lyme) is a couture milliner based in Central London. She is married to actor Tim Bentinck, also a peer of the realm, by which marriage she holds her titles.

Background and education
She was born to John Robert Emerson (Weardale, County Durham, 1920–1994) and wife Mary Elizabeth Graham (Chester, Cheshire, 1922–).

She attended Alleyne’s School (later Alleyne's High School), Stone, Staffordshire. She gained a BA in printed textiles at Liverpool College of Art, then later moved into the world of costume design, working for the RSC, the BBC and the Royal Opera House and teaching at the Bristol Old Vic Theatre School where she met her future husband.

Bentinck trained with Rose Cory, Royal Warrant Holder and world-renowned teacher.

Career
Portland Hats was started in 2002 and re-branded in 2004 to Judy Bentinck Millinery to 'emphasize the exclusivity of her product'. Housed at Cockpit Arts Studios in Holborn, Judy creates a Spring/Summer and an Autumn/Winter Collection each year, but the majority of her work is bespoke, by commission.

Bentinck teaches millinery through Cockpit Arts Studios and Central Saint Martins.

Family
The former Judy Emerson married the actor Tim Bentinck, who later became 12th Earl of Portland, in London on 8 September 1979; the couple has two sons: 
 William Jack Henry Bentinck, Viscount Woodstock (b. Highgate, 19 May 1984)
 The Hon. Jasper James Mellowes Bentinck (b. London, 12 June 1988)

See also
 Felicity Finch, who plays the fictional wife Ruth Archer, of Tim Bentincks's character in The Archers

References

 "Burke's Peerage and Baronetage"
 "Nederlands Adelsboek"
 http://familytrees.genopro.com/iaintait/Tree_Compilation/genomaps/genomap125.svg

1952 births
Living people
English fashion designers
Judy Bentinck
Portland
British milliners
People from Newcastle-under-Lyme
Alumni of Liverpool College of Art
British women fashion designers